Tadeusz Cuch (born 17 February 1945) was a Polish sprinter who specialized in the 100 metres.

He was born in Stary Bazanów and represented the club Legia Warszawa. At the inaugural 1964 European Junior Championships he won the bronze medal in the 100 metres, as well as a gold medal in the 4 x 100 metres relay and a silver medal in the medley relay where he ran the opening leg.

At the 1971 European Championships he won a silver medal in the 4 x 100 metres relay together with Marian Dudziak, Gerard Gramse and Zenon Nowosz. At the 1972 Olympic Games he competed in the 100 metres without progressing from round one. He also finished sixth in the 4 x 100 metres relay final, together with Stanisław Wagner, Jerzy Czerbniak and Zenon Nowosz.

His personal best time was 10.49 seconds, achieved in 1973.

References

1945 births
Living people
Polish male sprinters
Athletes (track and field) at the 1972 Summer Olympics
Polish athletics coaches
Olympic athletes of Poland
People from Ryki County
European Athletics Championships medalists
Sportspeople from Lublin Voivodeship
20th-century Polish people
21st-century Polish people